The 1988 Rye Brook Open was a men's tennis tournament played on outdoor hard courts that was part of the 1988 Nabisco Grand Prix. It was played at Rye Brook, New York in the United States from August 22 through August 29, 1988. Fourth-seeded Milan Šrejber won the singles title.

Finals

Singles

 Milan Šrejber defeated  Ramesh Krishnan 6–2, 7–6
 It was Šrejber's only singles title of his career.

Doubles

 Andrew Castle /  Tim Wilkison defeated  Jeremy Bates /  Michael Mortensen 4–6, 7–5, 7–6
 It was Castle's 2nd title of the year and the 2nd of his career. It was Wilkison's 1st title of the year and the 13th of his career.

References

External links
 ITF tournament edition details